Sphenodiscus is an extinct genus of acanthoceratacean ammonite. The genus has been found from  many continents and is thought to have had a large global distribution during the Maastrichtian stage of the Late Cretaceous. It was one of the last ammonoids to have evolved before the entire subclass became extinct during the Paleocene, which was directly after the Cretaceous–Paleogene extinction event.
 

Fossils have been found throughout North America from localities in South Carolina, North Carolina,  South Dakota, Maryland, New Jersey and Mexico. There is also evidence of the genus being present from the island of Trinidad, although the material found from here cannot be classified at the species level. Common species found in North America include S. lobatus, S. lenticularis, and S. pleurisepta. New species have been found from localities outside of North America such as S. binkhorsti from the Maastricht Formation in the Netherlands, S. siva from the Valudavur Formation in India and S. brasiliensis from the beds along the banks of the Rio Gramame in Brazil. Many specimens of S. lobatus have also been found from the Nkporo Shale in Nigeria.

The shell of Sphenodiscus was streamlined and lateromedially compressed with overlapping whorls and a small umbilicus. The ventral edge of the shell tends to be sharply angled. The outer surface is generally smooth in fossil specimens, although certain species at different stages of ontogenic development may possess many small tubercles along their surfaces. Sphenodiscus had a complex suture pattern with many small branching lobes and saddles.

References

External links
Sphenodiscus in the Paleobiology Database

Ammonitida genera
Acanthoceratoidea
Late Cretaceous ammonites of North America
Cretaceous United States
Maastrichtian life
Hell Creek fauna
Cretaceous Mexico
Fossils of Mexico
Ammonites of Europe
Late Cretaceous animals of Europe
Fossils of the Netherlands
Ammonites of South America
Late Cretaceous animals of South America
Cretaceous Brazil
Fossils of Brazil
Ammonites of Asia
Late Cretaceous animals of Asia
Fossils of India
Ammonites of Africa
Late Cretaceous animals of Africa
Fossils of Nigeria
Campanian genus first appearances
Maastrichtian genus extinctions
Fossil taxa described in 1871